Ahmadabad-e Kalij-e Sofla (also Romanized as Aḩmadābād-e Kalīj-e Soflá; also known as Aḩmadābād-e Kalīch) is a village in Dabuy-ye Shomali Rural District, Sorkhrud District, Mahmudabad County, Mazandaran Province, Iran. At the 2006 census, its population was 448, in 120 families.

References 

Populated places in Mahmudabad County